Henri Teyssedou (3 April 1889 – 24 January 1967) was a French long-distance runner. He competed in the marathon at the 1920 Summer Olympics.

References

1889 births
1967 deaths
Athletes (track and field) at the 1920 Summer Olympics
French male long-distance runners
French male marathon runners
Olympic athletes of France